Ali Anwar (died on 3 March 2014) was a Bangladeshi litterateur and translator. He served as a professor of the Department of English at the University of Rajshahi. He won Bangla Academy Literary Award in 2006 in the essay category.

Career
Anwar joined University of Rajshahi as a faculty member in 1962 and retired in 2001. He translated the plays of many dramatists, including Euripides and Harold Pinter.

References

1930s births
2014 deaths
Bangladeshi translators
Bangladeshi male writers
Recipients of Bangla Academy Award
Academic staff of the University of Rajshahi
Burials at Mirpur Martyred Intellectual Graveyard
Year of birth missing
Place of birth missing
20th-century translators